Suitland Manor is a neighborhood in the unincorporated community of Suitland in Prince George's County.  It is located on the northern side of the intersection of Md. Rt 218 (Suitland Road) and Md. Rt 458 (Silver Hill Road).  Directly across Suitland Road is the Suitland Federal Center, which is home to the national headquarters of the United States Census Bureau, as well as other government agencies.  On June 29, 2006, the Redevelopment Authority of Prince George's County issued a Request for Proposals inviting developers to redevelop the property into a new residential-focused mixed-use, town center.

Suitland history
The name Suitland first appeared on the map in 1878, probably as the name of a mail distribution point at the crossroads of Silver Hill Road and Suitland Road. It later became the Village of Suitland but by the 1920s it was still rural. The 1940s brought a surge of development with the demand for housing after World War II; the establishment of Andrews Air Force Base on the eastern periphery of the neighborhood; the building of the Suitland Parkway linking Washington D.C.; and the opening of the Census Bureau and the Naval Intelligence Support Center on the site now known as the Suitland Federal Center. Throughout the 1960s extensive apartment construction was introduced to Suitland. By 1970, multi-family units accounted for 80% of the total units.
Signs of neighborhood deterioration began to appear at this time. There were several areas that became plagued by numerous social problems: high crime rates, drugs, property-standard violations, absentee landlords, and ultimately disinvestment in the community.

In the 1990s, extensive neighborhood revitalization efforts began in the Suitland focus area to identify and prioritize local needs and develop a plan to address those needs. The plan included a broad vision and specific community recommendations, including the creation of a town center at the crossroads of Silver Hill Road and Suitland Road to revitalize the business district and the deteriorated Suitland Manor apartment complex.

Suitland Manor site
The Suitland Manor project site is located at the northwest quadrant of the intersection of Suitland Road and Silver Hill Road across from the Suitland Federal Center and within walking distance of the Suitland Metro Station. The existing 33 acre (130,000 m²) project area consists of marginal commercial businesses and deteriorating multi-family structures of varying densities. The existing housing included 167 four-unit buildings and 19 townhouses. There are nine commercial properties with frontage along Silver Hill Road, and three with frontage along Suitland Road. The adjacent residential neighborhood consists of established single-family homes, more recent townhouse developments, and apartments. A new elementary school has been built adjacent to the project site. The Redevelopment Authority of Prince George’s County is in the process of acquiring all the residential units to facilitate land assemblage for redevelopment of the site.

For decades, Suitland Manor has been plagued with debilitating illegal drug transactions and the ancillary crimes that result from drug dealing. Poor management controls created because of the high number of absentee landlords owning individual buildings has compromised the community environment. These ownership patterns that have evolved over the years have stymied comprehensive improvement efforts in this distressed multi-family community.

The development goal is to assemble the individual properties in Suitland Manor under one owner in order to start the revitalization process. The Redevelopment Authority (RA) is acquiring the entire residential portion of Suitland Manor for redevelopment. RA will be responsible for acquisition, tenant relocation, and demolition to prepare the property for development.

The new development will stress new homeownership opportunities with a diversity of housing types, layouts, building forms, and sizes. Housing opportunities will be available for a variety of lifestyles and income levels - from young professionals to seniors. Innovative architecture will create a distinctive development that will dramatically change the image of Suitland and bring a contemporary and competitive presence to the neighborhood.

Sustaining Suitland during redevelopment
The redevelopment process for Suitland includes acquisition, relocation, and demolition. The project is subject to the federal Uniform Relocation Assistance and Real Property Acquisition Policies Act of 1970 (URA). URA governs the rights of property owners and tenants throughout this process. To date, 159 families have been relocated from units owned by RA. Twenty of these families have purchased homes utilizing the URA benefits provided by RA.

The Redevelopment Authority works with Suitland community leaders and other county agencies to control trash and illegal dumping that are attracted to the area. An on-site property manager handles all issues associated with vacant properties and tenants waiting to be relocated.

To reduce crime in Suitland Manor, RA is working with the Prince George's County Police Department and the Office of the State’s Attorney through their Asset Forfeiture Unit and the Nuisance Abatement Program to eliminate illegal drug activity in the Suitland Manor apartments. RA is also offering an additional $1,000 reward to anyone providing information for the arrest and conviction of an individual committing an illegal act in Suitland Manor.

Two buildings with 8 apartments have been held back from demolition to accommodate the Alpha Kappa Alpha sorority, Delta Sigma Theta sorority, and the Omega Psi Phi fraternity - organizations offering mentoring and educational outreach programs to the youth in the community. In addition, the Youth 2002 entrepreneurial program is providing business skill training from one of these building to engage youth with entrepreneurial interests.

These services are intended ultimately to promote self-sufficiency, provide learning opportunities for children, and play a part in RA’s mission of community building. The community services provided will evolve as conditions and needs arise during the development process in Suitland and will be part of the new community that is built. Whether they are recreational programs, educational offerings, meeting spaces, or family support services, these opportunities are a catalyst to improve the individual, the family, the neighborhood, and the larger community, and are part of creating the new Suitland.

In late August 2005, Suitland Elementary School opened at the top of the block on Homer Avenue.

Suitland community redevelopment goals
The Suitland Manor initiative is designed to create a new Suitland neighborhood through a comprehensive redevelopment strategy. The goal is to create a unique image for Suitland that will help forge a sense of community and create a cohesive new neighborhood. It will also include a mix of uses offering commercial and community services with the residential development. This helps to attract people to live, work and play in the same area. Diversity through mixed-use usually translates into density and vibrancy. They are also safe communities that are physically designed to deter crime and ensure a safe living environment. Suitland Manor, along with the other properties sitting within the redevelopment site, is zoned M-U-TC (Mixed-Use Town Center). This zone was created to encourage the establishment of higher density and mixed-uses that foster an environment supportive to a diverse range of residential units, commercial activities, and income groups.

External links
Redevelopment Authority of Prince George’s County. Suitland Manor Development.
Prince George's Set to Raze Much of Deadly Drug Market

Unincorporated communities in Maryland